SPIA may be (in alphabetical order):
 Sardar Patel International Airport, Ahmedabad
 Shanghai Pudong International Airport, Shanghai, China
 Silvio Pettirossi International Airport Asunción, Paraguay
 Single premium immediate annuity
 South Pacific Island Airways
 University of Georgia School of Public and International Affairs
 Virginia Tech School of Public and International Affairs